The European Qualification Tournament for the 2016 Men's Olympic Volleyball Tournament was held in Berlin, Germany from 5 to 10 January 2016. Russia won the tournament by beating France 3–1, and qualified for the Summer Olympics. Sergey Tetyukhin was selected the most valuable player.

Qualification
The hosts Germany and the top seven ranked teams from the CEV European Ranking as of 19 October 2015 which had not yet qualified to the 2016 Summer Olympics qualified for the tournament. Rankings are shown in brackets except the hosts who ranked 4th.

 (Hosts)
 (1)
 (3)
 (4)
 (6)
 (7)
 (8)
 (9)

Pools composition
Teams were seeded following the serpentine system according to their CEV European Ranking as of 19 October 2015. CEV reserved the right to seed the hosts as head of pool A regardless of the European Ranking. The pools were confirmed on 23 October 2015.

Squads

Venue

Pool standing procedure
 Number of matches won
 Match points
 Sets ratio
 Points ratio
 Result of the last match between the tied teams

Match won 3–0 or 3–1: 3 match points for the winner, 0 match points for the loser
Match won 3–2: 2 match points for the winner, 1 match point for the loser

Preliminary round
All times are Central European Time (UTC+01:00).

Pool A

Pool B

Final round
All times are Central European Time (UTC+01:00).

Semifinals

3rd place match

Final

Final standing
{| class="wikitable" style="text-align:center;"
|-
!width=40|Rank
!width=180|Team
|- bgcolor=#ccffcc
|1
|style="text-align:left;"|
|- bgcolor=#dfefff
|2
|style="text-align:left;"|
|- bgcolor=#dfefff
|3
|style="text-align:left;"|
|-
|4
|style="text-align:left;"|
|-
|5
|style="text-align:left;"|
|-
|6
|style="text-align:left;"|
|-
|7
|style="text-align:left;"|
|-
|8
|style="text-align:left;"|
|}

Awards

Most Valuable Player
 Sergey Tetyukhin
Best Setter
 Benjamin Toniutti
Best Outside Spikers
 Earvin N'Gapeth
 Denys Kaliberda
Best Middle Blockers
 Marcus Böhme
 Mateusz Bieniek
Best Opposite Spiker
 Maxim Mikhaylov
Best Libero
 Jenia Grebennikov

See also
Volleyball at the 2016 Summer Olympics – Women's European qualification

References

External links
Official website

2016 in volleyball
Volleyball qualification for the 2016 Summer Olympics
2016 in German sport
Sports competitions in Berlin
International volleyball competitions hosted by Germany